Holidays for Sale was an Australian holiday and travel television series that debuted on 17 May 2008, on the Nine Network. It was hosted by Australia's Funniest Home Videos host Shelley Craft, and presented by a team of diverse Nine Network personalities. It is now a website dedicated to offering the cheapest Australian holidays and is featured each week in the Nine Network's Getaway program.

External links
Official Website

2008 Australian television series debuts
2008 Australian television series endings
Nine Network original programming